Marcelo Hoyo (born 22 April 1962) is a Mexican modern pentathlete. He competed at the 1984 and 1988 Summer Olympics.

References

External links
 

1962 births
Living people
Mexican male modern pentathletes
Olympic modern pentathletes of Mexico
Modern pentathletes at the 1984 Summer Olympics
Modern pentathletes at the 1988 Summer Olympics
20th-century Mexican people